Gusztáv von Pados (11 October 1881 – 30 September 1963) was a Hungarian equestrian. He competed in two events at the 1936 Summer Olympics.

References

External links
 

1881 births
1963 deaths
Hungarian male equestrians
Olympic equestrians of Hungary
Equestrians at the 1936 Summer Olympics
People from Kőszeg
Sportspeople from Vas County